The 1970 FIBA Intercontinental Cup was the 5th edition of the FIBA Intercontinental Cup for men's basketball clubs. It took place at Palazzo dello Sport, Varese. From the FIBA European Champions Cup participated Ignis Varese, Real Madrid, and Slavia VŠ Praha, from the South American Club Championship participated SC Corinthians, and from the NABL participated the Columbia Sertoma.

Participants

League stage
Day 1, September 23, 1970

|}

Day 2, September 24, 1970

|}

Day 3, September 25, 1970

|}

Day 4, September 26, 1970

|}

Day 5, September 27, 1970

|}

Final standings

External links
 1970 Intercontinental Basketball Cup

1970–71
1970–71 in American basketball
1970–71 in European basketball
1970–71 in South American basketball
International basketball competitions hosted by Italy
1970 in Italian sport